The 2006 Sylvania 300 was an NASCAR Nextel Cup Series race held on September 17, 2006 at New Hampshire International Speedway, in Loudon, New Hampshire. Contested at 300 laps on the  speedway, it was the 27th race of the 2006 NASCAR Nextel Cup Series season. Kevin Harvick of Richard Childress Racing won the race.

Background
New Hampshire International Speedway is a  oval speedway located in Loudon, New Hampshire which has hosted NASCAR racing annually since the early 1990s, as well as an IndyCar weekend and the oldest motorcycle race in North America, the Loudon Classic.  Nicknamed "The Magic Mile", the speedway is often converted into a  road course, which includes much of the oval. The track was originally the site of Bryar Motorsports Park before being purchased and redeveloped by Bob Bahre. The track is currently one of eight major NASCAR tracks owned and operated by Speedway Motorsports.

Qualifying

Results

Race Statistics
 Time of race: 3:06:21
 Average Speed: 
 Pole Speed: 
 Cautions: 10 for 47 laps
 Margin of Victory: 0.777 sec
 Lead changes: 17
 Percent of race run under caution: 15.7%         
 Average green flag run: 23 laps

References

External links

Sylvania 300
Sylvania 300
NASCAR races at New Hampshire Motor Speedway
September 2006 sports events in the United States